Osvaldo Chavarría Quijano (born August 5, 1937, Colón, Panama) is a former Major League Baseball player. When he made his major league debut with the Kansas City Athletics on April 14, he became the thirteenth Panamanian born baseball player to make it to the majors.

Career
After one season with the Cubs organization, he was acquired by the A's in a minor league transaction prior to the  season. He made his major league debut in left field against the Minnesota Twins at Metropolitan Stadium, and was held hitless by Jim Kaat in four at-bats. Over his two major league seasons, Chavarría also played first, second, third base and shortstop.

Chavarría was still with the Athletics organization when they moved to Oakland, California prior to the start of the  season. He was traded to the New York Yankees with Danny Cater for Al Downing and Frank Fernández prior to the start of the  season. After two seasons with the Yankees' International League affiliate, the Syracuse Chiefs, Chavarría was dealt to Mexico City Tigers of the Mexican League for Celerino Sanchez.

After retiring as a player, Chavarría became an umpire. He worked in the minor leagues, including the Northwest League, and college games. He has also umpired numerous international events, including the 1992 Olympics, the Baseball World Cup, Pan American Games and Intercontinental Cup.

References

External links

Pelota Binaria (Venezuelan Winter League)

1937 births
Living people
Binghamton Triplets players
Birmingham Barons players
Cafeteros de Córdoba players
Cardenales de Lara players
Dallas Rangers players
Indios de Ciudad Juárez (minor league) players
Iowa Oaks players
Kansas City Athletics players
Lewiston Broncs players
Major League Baseball players from Panama
Montreal Expos scouts
Morristown Cubs players
Panamanian expatriate baseball players in Canada
Panamanian expatriate baseball players in Mexico
Panamanian expatriate baseball players in the United States
Sportspeople from Colón, Panama
Sanford Greyhounds players
Syracuse Chiefs players
Toronto Blue Jays scouts
Vancouver Mounties players
Panamanian expatriate baseball players in Venezuela